Abdel Halim Mohamed Abdel Halim  (10 April 1910–16 April 2009) was a Sudanese physician, writer, political activist, civil servant, and sports administrator. 

He was born in Omdurman, Anglo-Egyptian Sudan, into a family of scholars, writers and politicians, and a grandfather who was a Mahdist prince and military leader. Abdel Halim became a doctor, graduating from Kitchener School of Medicine and training between Khartoum and London. Due to his contributions, he is remembered as the ‘Father of medicine in Sudan’ and among the first Sudanese to become a senior physician and a Fellow of the Royal College of Physicians.

Abdel Halim was one of the founders of the Graduates' General Congress demanding independence from the Anglo-Egyptian occupation. After independence, he was the mayor of Khartoum until 1960, and later a member of the Committee of Sovereignty of Sudan (1964–1965). He was nicknamed the ‘wise Sheikh’ due to his political impartiality.

Abdel Halim was one of the founders of the Confederation of African Football and the president of the Sudan Football Association, Sudan Equestrian Association, Sudan Olympic Committee and Sudanese Basketball Association. He served as the third president of the Confederation of African Football from 1968 to 1972 and 1987 to 1988. He stood firm against South Africa and Rhodesia sport-segregation policies and refused to allow their teams to play unless it was mixed.

Abdel Halim received national and international accolades. He died in Khartoum, aged 99.

Early life 
Abdel Halim Mohamed Abdel Halim Musaad Hashim was born in Omdurman, Anglo-Egyptian Sudan, on 10 April 1910 into the ‘Hashmab’ family, a family of scholars, writers and politicians with a pedigree equal to many of the gentry. Abdel Halim was named after his grandfather, a Mahdist prince and military leader. His grandfather played a decisive role in the defeat of British colonel Hicks Pasha in the battle of Shaykan in 1883 and the siege and fall of Khartoum in 1885. He died at the Battle of Toski on 3 August 1889.

Abdel Halim grew up with Chronic obstructive pulmonary disease (COPD), which led to the failure of one of his lungs in his youth.

Education 
Like many at that time, Abdel Halim started his education at a Quranic school (Khalwa) before entering Omdurman Primary School. He then went to Gordon Memorial College (today University Khartoum) in 1924, into accountancy, before attending Kitchener School of Medicine (today Faculty of Medicine, University of Khartoum) (1929–1933) and graduated top of his class with a Diploma of Kitchener School of Medicine (DKSM).
 
Abdel Halim started his medical training as a house physician at Khartoum Teaching Hospital (1933–1934) and then as a medical registrar (1935–1938). He then continued his training in medicine and cardiology at Hammersmith Hospital, London, in 1939.  Due to the Second World War, he had to return to the Khartoum Teaching Hospital to work as an assistant to the senior physician. Still, after the war, he returned to the UK to finish his medicine and cardiology training.

Medical career 
Abdel Halim became the first Sudanese director of Omdurman Teaching Hospital (1950) and Khartoum Teaching Hospital (1954–1964). He was appointed senior physician to the Ministry of Health in 1953. He expanded these hospitals to include respiratory, cardio, neurology, neurosurgery and dermatology services and organised the building of the Al Shaab Teaching Hospital. After Sudan's independence, he also taught at the Kitchener School of Medicine and Faculty of Medicine, University of Khartoum.
 
Abdel Halim was a council member of the Gordon Memorial College from 1952, before becoming the first Sudanese chairman of the University Khartoum council, after Sudan became independent in 1956. He held the position until he retired from medical duties in 1965.
 
Abdel Halim was the founding president of the Sudanese Medical Association (1949–1965). He was one of the first Sudanese physicians to become a member of the Royal College of Physicians in 1948, and to be elected a Fellow (FRCP) in 1962. In 1965, Abdel Halim received an honorary Doctor of Medicine (MD) from the University of Khartoum.

Medical legacy 
In the past, when investigative techniques were crude, Abdel Halim was described as “a superb medical diagnostician and an inspiring instructor. His medical ward rounds provided a platform for rigorous medical instruction, poetry, high-flying prose, Sudanese proverbs, and Qur’anic verses, in flawless classical Arabic and perfect English; everything was communicated with style and humour.” Abdel Halim is remembered as the ‘Father of medicine in Sudan’.

Literary and political activism

Al Fajr 
With his cousin, Muhammad Ahmad Mahgoub, Abdel Halim founded the ‘Hashmab society’, which advocated for education and enlightenment in Sudan. At the end of the 1920s, the society evolved to become ‘Al Fajr’ (the Dawn) society which established its magazine in 1934 that was committed to Sudanese folklore, culture and nationalist movements. Abdel Halim regularly contributed to Al Fajr magazine under a pen name. A book written by Muhammad Ahmad Mahgoub and Abdel Halim, titled “Death of a world”, advocated personal sacrifice for the national cause. They wrote in its introduction:

Before and after Sudan independence 
Abdel Halim was among the founders of the Graduates' General Congress in 1938 that later drafted the first memorandum in 1942, demanding independence from the Anglo-Egyptian occupation. Abdel Halim was the political adviser and confidant to Abd al-Rahman al-Mahdi, one of the leading religious and political figures during the colonial era in Anglo-Egyptian Sudan.

In 1956 and after Sudan's independence, Abdel Halim became the Khartoum District Council’s president and mayor of Khartoum until 1960. After the overthrow of General Ibrahim Abboud's dictatorship in 1964, Abdel Halim served as a member of the first and second Committee of Sovereignty, from 3 December 1964 to 8 July 1965, which presided over the interim coalition Government that paved the way for general elections.

Political legacy 
During his life, Abdel Halim distanced himself from partisan politics. Fadwa Abdel Rahman Ali Taha, the Sudanese historian and scholar, emphasised that, after Sudan's independence, Abdel Halim felt that much could have been achieved if the Graduates' General Congress movement had stayed on course and not been overwhelmed by the intense division between political parties. The Sudanese historian and scholar Mansour Khalid nicknamed Abdel Halim the ‘wise Sheikh’.

Abdel Halim received El Neelain Order and the Righteous Son of Sudan Order.

Sports administration 
Abdel Halim was the president of the Sudan Football Association (1953), the Sudan Basketball Association (1960), the Sudan Equestrian Association, and the Sudan Olympic Committee (1956–1958 and 1964–1970). He was a member of the International Olympic Committee from 1968 until 1982.

CAF and FIFA 

Abdel Halim was behind the idea of forming an African football association. He was one of the founders of the Confederation of African Football (CAF), which was established on 8 February 1957 at the Grand Hotel in Khartoum, Sudan by the national football associations of Egypt, Ethiopia, South Africa and Sudan. This meeting followed the formal discussions between the aforementioned associations at the FIFA Congress, held on 7 June 1956 at Avenida Hotel in Lisbon, Portugal. 

Abdel Halim served as the third president of the CAF from 1968 to 1972. Upon Yidnekatchew Tessema's sudden illness and death on 19 August 1987, Abdel Halim served as the (fifth) president of the CAF until 10 March 1988, when the general assembly was held in Casablanca, and Issa Hayatou was elected president of CAF.

Abdel Halim was the first African to be elected as a member of the executive council of the International Association of Football Federation (FIFA) (1958–1962). He later became the head of the medical department of FIFA in 1966.

Sports activism 
In 1970, as CAF president, Abdel Halim secured the vote to suspend Rhodesia's (modern-day Zimbabwe) FIFA membership due to their sport-segregation policies. This came years after the CAF expelled the Rhodesia Football Association, only four days after the country's unilateral declaration of independence on 11 November 1965. The CAF was again the first International sports institution to expel Apartheid South Africa in 1957, before the first African Cup of Nations, in Sudan, promoting further tension with FIFA, which accused the CAF of “mixing sport with politics.” Abdel Halim pushed and succeeded in including African nations in the 1970 FIFA World Cup, after 36 years of absence since Egypt's participation in the 1934 FIFA World Cup.

Abdel Halim led the African boycott of the 1976 Summer Olympics, which was in Montreal because the International Olympic Committee (IOC) refused to ban New Zealand after the New Zealand national rugby union team had toured apartheid South Africa earlier in 1976 in defiance of the United Nations' calls for a sporting embargo. Abdel Halim supported the boycott of the 1980 Summer Olympics, in Moscow, as a protest against the Soviet Union's invasion of Afghanistan.

Sporting legacy 
Abdel Halim stood firm against South Africa and Rhodesia sport-segregation policies and refused to allow their teams to play unless it was mixed. According to Sudanese sports historian el-Keer el-Moutasim, Abdel Halim took out a loan on his own house to fund the 1970 African Cup of Nations, in Sudan, when official funding was delayed. 

Abdel Halim was made an honorary life member of the International Olympic Committee in 1989, and honorary life president of CAF. In 1994, he received the FIFA Order of Merit. However, according to the Sudanese football journalist Muzammil Abu Al-Qasim, due to personal disputes with Kamal Shaddad, President of the Sudan Football Association (SFA) (2001-2021), Abdel Halim was not honoured during his life or posthumously by SFA.
However, upon his death on 16 April 2009, the SFA lowered its flag for three days to symbolise mourning and a minute of silence was observed before football matches during these three days. Sepp Blatter, president of FIFA, paid tribute to Abdel Halim, stating that:In the name of the international football community, we would like to pass on our sincerest condolences to the people of Africa, particularly the family and close friends of Dr Abdel Halim Mohamed. He will be sorely missed for his great intellect, determination and dedication by those whose lives he touched, whether on a personal level or as a result of the prodigious contribution he made within CAF during its emergence after 1956.

Personal life and death 
Abdel Halim married Khalda Ahmed Khalil in 1942, who died in 1987. They had two daughters and five sons. Abdel Halim died in Khartoum on 16 April 2009, at the age of 99.

References

Presidents of the Confederation of African Football
Association football executives
1910 births
2009 deaths
People from Omdurman
Sudanese physicians
Sudanese politicians
20th-century physicians
Sudanese writers
Sudanese civil servants
Recipients of orders, decorations, and medals of Sudan